Deborah Boone (born 1951) is an American politician from the state of Oregon. She served as a Democratic member of the Oregon House of Representatives, where she represented District 32. Her time in office began with her appointment on August 4, 2004, to serve out the remaining term of Representative Elaine Hopson. Boone won election in 2004 and was re-elected in 2006, 2008, 2010, 2012, 2014, and 2016. She was succeeded by Representative Tiffiny Mitchell, who was elected in 2018 and took office in 2019.

District 32

Oregon's 32nd House District includes parts of Clatsop, Tillamook, and Washington counties in Northwest Oregon.  The district office is in Cannon Beach.

References

Specific

General
 http://gov.oregonlive.com/legislators/Deborah-Boone/

External links
 Oregon State House - Deborah Boone official government website
 Project Vote Smart - Representative Deborah Boone (OR
 

Living people
Members of the Oregon House of Representatives
People from Seaside, Oregon
Women state legislators in Oregon
1951 births
21st-century American politicians
21st-century American women politicians